The I-Land is an American science fiction thriller streaming television miniseries created by Anthony Salter. The series is executive produced by Neil LaBute, Chad Oakes and Mike Frislev. The series stars Kate Bosworth, Natalie Martinez, Ronald Peet, Kyle Schmid, Gilles Geary, Sibylla Deen, Anthony Lee Medina, Kota Eberhardt, Michelle Veintimilla and Alex Pettyfer. It was released on September 12, 2019 on Netflix. The series received overwhelmingly negative reviews from critics.

Synopsis
Ten people wake up on the beach of what appears to be a deserted tropical island. None of them have any memory of who they are or how they got there, and each takes on the name that is printed on their clothes tags. The group make initial attempts to band together, but differing priorities and strong personalities cause some of them to clash. In particular, Chase, who wants to investigate the island, doesn't get along with KC, who is suspicious of Chase's ability to find resources, and Brody, who attempts to rape Chase.

When Brody is murdered, the group assume Chase is responsible and knock her unconscious. Chase wakes up in a futuristic Texas correctional prison facility, where she learns that she and the other nine people are violent crime prisoners, and are part of a "rehabilitation simulation". Their minds have been put in the computer simulation of the island to test if they'll resume old behavioral patterns. Anyone who dies in the simulation dies in real life. Chase is returned to the island simulation, where the avatars of two prison marshals arrive to deliberately cause the group to fight and split up. Additionally, the prisoners' memories start to return, which causes further friction and confusion.

Cast and characters

Main
 Natalie Martinez as Gabriela Chase, a military veteran imprisoned for her mother's murder. While on the I-Land, she was made to believe she murdered her mother. She discovers that she is married to Cooper. After Cooper admits to framing Chase for the murder of her mother, she is released from the I-Land program and is taken off of death row.
 Kate Bosworth as KC, a formerly abused wife and waitress imprisoned for murdering her two sons. She was flirted with as a waitress and had an affair with a man from Chicago. After learning this, she was drowned and almost killed in her kitchen sink by her abusive husband when she told him she did not love him.  He releases her from being drowned and tells her she can have her divorce but she will never see her sons again. She then drugs her two young sons using cough medicine and drove into the ocean to drown them. She later attempted suicide by stabbing herself in the stomach in front of her husband.
 Ronald Peet as Cooper, a disfigured former military commander who became a farmer. He is married to Chase. He accidentally killed his mother in-law during a struggle.  He stages this to look like a break in but they both are arrested for the crime.  In a flashback to this memory he accidentally shoots Moses in the stomach, killing him.
 Kyle Schmid as Moses, a former rights extremist who planned to make a statement by causing a gas pipeline explosion, but was arrested after he accidentally killed several workers touring the pipeline site. In the I-Land program, he got shot in the stomach by Cooper.
 Sibylla Deen as Blair, a former nurse who practiced euthanasia, killing many of her patients by injecting potassium chloride into her patients' IV bags. While in the I-Land program, she shoots Donovan with a flare gun after he strangles Mason.
 Gilles Geary as Mason, the gunman in a mass shooting at a supermarket. He planned on shooting himself after, but couldn't muster the strength to do it. Instead he was apprehended and put on death row.  On the I-Land he is strangled to death by Donovan.
 Anthony Lee Medina as Donovan, a dangerously obsessive man who killed a former coworker after being rejected. In the I-Land program, after Blair rejects his advances and proposal of marriage, he strangles Mason after believing they were a couple. He is later shot and killed by Blair with a flare gun after proposing yet again.
 Kota Eberhardt as Taylor, a former bank robber with an easily manipulative nature. She attempts to escape I-Land and finds II-Land, an island inhabited by a cannibal. Bonnie and Clyde find her on the new island and leave her to die with the cannibal. She discovers that the chicken soup that had been left for her to eat was made of her fingers.
 Michelle Veintimilla as Hayden, a former murderer of sex offenders of men who hurt women. She was killed by Clyde for murdering Brody.
 Alex Pettyfer as Brody, an incarcerated sex offender. He sexually violates and attempts to rape Chase and KC during his time in the I-Land program. He was stabbed and killed by Hayden after she believed he was the cause of dissension in the group.

Recurring
 Clara Wong as Bonnie, who gets stabbed in the throat by Chase during a struggle while she and Clyde try to kill Cooper.
 Keilyn Durrel Jones as Clyde, who stabs Chase in the stomach during a struggle while he and Bonnie try to kill Cooper.
 Bruce McGill as Warden Wells, the corrupt and powerful cowboy-style prison warden who tries to sabotage the I-Land program through Bonnie and Clyde. After he is found out and fired as warden, he gets sent to the I-Land program as one of the participants to redeem himself.
 María Conchita Alonso as Mrs. Chase, Gabriela Chase's mother, accidentally shot in the head by Cooper during a struggle.
 Subhash Mandal as Doctor Conrad, the prison doctor who appears to be sympathetic to the main characters and their situation.
 Margaret Colin as Doctor Stevenson, one of the original neural architects of the I-Land and a member of the rehabilitation advisory board.

Production

Development
On September 28, 2018, it was announced that Netflix had given the production a series order for a seven-episode first season. Neil LaBute was set to serve as co-director, writer and showrunner for the miniseries along with directorial credits from Jonathan Scarfe and writing credits from Lucy Teitler. Executive producers were expected to include LaBute, Chad Oakes, and Mike Frislev with Lucy Teitler and Jonathan Scarfe serving as co-executive producers and Kate Bosworth acting as a producer. Production companies involved with the miniseries were slated to consist of Nomadic Pictures Entertainment. The production company reportedly spent a budget of $14 million for the first season, with each episode costing $2 million. On August 20, 2019, it was reported that the miniseries was set to be released on September 12, 2019.

Casting
Alongside the series order announcement, it was confirmed that Kate Bosworth, Natalie Martinez, and Alex Pettyfer would star in the miniseries. In October 2018, it was announced that Kyle Schmid had been cast in a starring role. In December 2018, it was reported that Clara Wong had joined the cast in a recurring capacity. In August 2019, Gilles Geary joined the main cast. In the same month, it was confirmed that Michelle Veintimilla, Kota Eberhardt, Sibylla Deen, Ronald Peet and Anthony Lee Medina would star in the miniseries.

Filming
Filming for the first miniseries took place in Pinewood Indomina Studios, Dominican Republic, San Pedro De Macoris and Las Terrenas, Samaná, Dominican Republic from October 15, 2018 to December 19, 2018.

Episodes

Release
On August 20, 2019, the teaser trailer for the miniseries was released. On August 29, 2019, the official trailer for the miniseries was released.

Reception
The review aggregator website Rotten Tomatoes reported an 8% approval rating with an average rating of 3/10, based on 12 reviews. The site's critical consensus reads, "Bafflingly bad, the only mystery is how The I-Land got made in the first place."

Tim Surette, writing for TV Guide, gave the miniseries a rating of 0.5/5, summarizing that it "is an astonishingly dumb seven-episode mystery-box limited series about 10 people who wake up on a deserted tropical island with no memory of who they are or how they got there. But that central conceit is quickly resolved by Episode 3, as The I-Land spins out of control, rolls over, and wraps itself around an entirely new and equally stupid story."

Writing for The Hollywood Reporter, Daniel Fienberg compared the miniseries to the series Lost "only with a fundamental misunderstanding of how Lost handled character development, mythology, flashback structure, theme and ensemble-building." He also wrote that "no aspect of The I-Land works, and every bad aspect builds on the bad aspects before in a way that makes it pretty clear that nobody involved could have been under any misapprehensions about the quality of the endeavor."

At Paste, Allison Keene said "I have watched some truly, truly bad series in my day, but few that went off the rails this hard this fast. But man, what a ride. Cannibals, climate change, rogue simulations, for-profit prisons, a game with no rules and no logic … what an embarrassment of riches. Or just an embarrassment. We’ll go with that last one."

In his "Stream It Or Skip It" review, Joel Keller at Decider stated that the miniseries should be skipped and summarizes that "The I-Land‘s clunky dialogue and generic characters make us care very little about why these ten jerks are on this island. And, yes, they’re all pretty much jerks."

Jack Seale at The Guardian gave the miniseries one out of five stars and summarizes that "This is sci-fi without a vision, a genre piece that doesn’t know how its own genre works. The I-Land is begging to be forgotten."

Writing for RogerEbert.com, Brian Tallerico summarized that "The ‘I’ stands for Idiotic. If you put a group of teenagers in a room and showed them a few episodes of LOST and Westworld before asking them to write their own program, they might come up with The I-Land," and that "It is a bafflingly horrible sci-fi show, the kind of project that leaves your jaw on the floor, not unlike the first time you saw Tommy Wiseau’s The Room."

References

External links
 
 

2010s American science fiction television series
2019 American television series debuts
2019 American television series endings
American adventure television series
American thriller television series
English-language Netflix original programming
American science fiction web series
Thriller television series
Television series set on fictional islands
Television shows set on islands
Television shows filmed in the Dominican Republic
Thriller web series